Festus, whose name also appears in the manuscripts of his work as Rufus Festus, Ruffus Festus, Sextus Festus, Sextus Rufus, and Sextus, was a Late Roman historian and proconsul of Asia whose epitome Breviarium rerum gestarum populi Romani ("Summary of the history of Rome") was commissioned by the emperor Valens in preparation for his war against Persia. It was completed about AD 370. The Breviarium covers the entire history of the Roman state from the foundation of the City until AD 364. The book consists of 30 chapters treating events in Roman history in terse overview, mainly focused on military and political conflicts. It is estimated as a work of very low quality.

Festus of Tridentum, magister memoriae (secretary) to Valens and notoriously severe proconsul of the province of Asia, where he was sent to punish those implicated in the conspiracy of Theodorus. The work itself (Breviarium rerum gestarum populi Romani) is divided into two parts, one geographical, the other historical. J. W. Eadie has shown that Festus used the following sources:
The Breviarium historiae Romanae of Eutropius, newly compiled by order of the same emperor
The Epitome rerum Romanarum (until the reign of Augustus) by Florus
The epitome of Livy, a lost work based on Ab Urbe condita
 A history of the Roman emperors, perhaps the one that is called the Enmannsche Kaisergeschichte

References

Sources
 Ammianus Marcellinus, Res Gestae 29.2.22.
 Eunapius, Vitae sophistarum 7.6.6-13.
 Suda s.v. .
 Zosimus, Historia Nova 4.15.2-3.

External links
"Sextus Rufus" in Smith's Dictionary of Greek and Roman Biography and Mythology

Roman governors of Asia
Ancient Roman proconsuls
4th-century Latin writers
Latin historians
4th-century historians